Scotura occidentalis is a moth of the family Notodontidae. It is found in southern Ecuador.

The length of the forewings is 13–14 mm for males and 14 mm for females. The ground color of the forewings is gray-brown to slate gray to gray-brown, slightly lighter at the base. The ground color of the hindwings is slate gray to dark gray, with a blue iridescence.

References

Moths described in 2008
Notodontidae of South America